Hind Hussain Mohammed or Nariman Hussein Murad, more commonly known by her stage name Hind Rostom, (  ; November 12, 1929 – August 8, 2011) was an Egyptian actress and is considered one of the seduction icons in the Egyptian cinema, as she was mainly known for her sensual roles. Her physical appearance earned her the name Marilyn Monroe of the east "مارلين مونرو الشرق". Hind Rostom starred in more than 80 movies in her career.

Early life
Hind Hussain Mohammed was born in the neighborhood of Moharram Bek, Alexandria, Egypt on November 12, 1929. She was born to a Middle class family, to an Egyptian mother and an Egyptian Alexandrian father.

Career 
She started her career at the age of 16 with the film Azhaar wa Ashwak (Flowers and Thorns). Her first true success was in 1955 when the famous director Hassan Al Imam offered her a role in Banat el Lail  (Women of the Night). Her famous films include Ezz El-Dine Zulficar's Back Again (Rodda Qalbi) with Shoukry Sarhan, Mariam Fakhr Eddine and Salah Zulfikar in 1957, Ibn Hamidu with Ismail Yassine in 1957, Youssef Chahine's Cairo Station (The Iron Gate / Bab El Hadid) with Farid Shawki in 1958, Salah Abu Seif's La Anam (Sleepless) with Faten Hamama, Omar Sharif, and Rushdy Abaza in 1958, Sira' fi al-Nil (Struggle in the Nile) with Omar Sharif and Rushdy Abaza in 1959, and Chafika el Koptia (Chafika the Coptic Girl) in 1963, where she played the role of a Coptic Orthodox nun. Rostom was known as the queen of seduction in Egyptian cinema, the "Marilyn Monroe of the East (or of the Egyptian cinema)". She decided to retire acting in 1979 because she wanted the audience to remember her at her best.

In December 2002 Rostom once more turned down an offer of £E1,000,000 for her biography. The offer was made by an Egyptian satellite channel to portray her life as a drama series. She was asked to submit a complete history of her past achievements, and work experiences with prominent actors of the past, such as Farid Shawki, Salah Zulfikar, Shukri Sarhan, and Shadia. The actress stated that she refused to sell her life as a means of entertainment and felt that her personal life was of her concern and no one else. Rostom made a statement when she turned down belly dancer Fifi Abdo's invitation to attend a party held in Hind Rostom's honour.

In 2004, she refused to accept Egypt's State Merit Award in Arts, "The award came too late, I'm not placed on the shelf for them to pick me whenever they want, there's only one Hind Rostom in the middle east, and let's consider that the number of my generation star actresses isn't that big enough to ignore us, and also it's not appropriate to honor me after years of honoring people who are less than me, another point is that I also refuse to honor me before Shadia, she'd deserved it and she was a star longtime before me", Rostom commented.

Marriages
 She was married twice, once to Hassan Reda, a film director and father of her only daughter, Basant, then to Dr. Mohammad Fayaad, a gynecologist.

Death 
On August 8, 2011, Rostom died in a hospital in Al-Mohandeseen, Giza due to a heart attack, at the age of 81.

Honours 
On November 12, 2018, Google recognized her with a doodle.

Selected filmography

Film

References

External links
 .
Biography on Bibliotheca Alexandrina
 An interview with Hend Rostom. 
 Al-Ahram's article. 
 Hind Rostom’s 87th Birthday

1931 births
2011 deaths
Hind Rostom
Egyptian comedians
20th-century Egyptian actresses
Egyptian film actresses
Egyptian stage actresses
People from Alexandria